DMS Maritime, formerly Defence Maritime Services, is a company providing port services to the Australian Defence Force and Marine Unit. It is a subsidiary of Serco.

History

Defence Maritime Services was founded in 1997 as a 50:50 joint venture between P&O Maritime Services and Serco to fulfill a contract to organise tug boats and ferries and supply and maintain small boats for the Royal Australian Navy (RAN). In 2012, Serco bought out P&O's shareholding.

Headquartered in Sydney, it has operations in Cairns, Darwin, Dampier, Fremantle, Western Port, Jervis Bay and Sydney. It currently operates eight oceangoing vessels and over 100 harbour craft and has around 350 staff. The services DMS is contracted to provide to the RAN include operating tug boats and lighters at RAN bases, training members of the RAN, and maintaining RAN warships.

Vessels operated

Auxiliaries
General-purpose tenders
Seahorse Spirit
Seahorse Standard
Both Vessels have been Retired and removed from DMS Service.

Submarine rescue and escape ships

Yard and service craft
60-ton flat-top lighters
FTL 60101
FTL 60102
FTL 60103
FTL 60104
FTL 60105
FTL 60107
FTL 60108
FTL 60109
FTL 60110
FTL 60111
FTL 60112
FTL 60113
FTL 60114
FTL 60115
FTL 60116
FTL 60117
FTL 60118
FTL 60119
FTL 60120
FTL 60121

Southerly 65 class diving tenders
2001 Dugong
2003 Seal
2004 Shark

Miscellaneous concrete ammunition lighters
CAL 209
CAL 5012
CAL 10011
CAL 10012
CAL 10013
CAL 10014

Wattle class crane stores lighters

CSL 01 Wattle
CSL 02 Boronia
CSL 03 Telopea

Steber 43 naval general purpose workboats
NGPWB 01 Patonga
NGPWB 02 
NGPWB 03 
NGPWB 04 Sea Dragon
NGPWB 05 
NGPWB 06 
NGPWB 07
NGPWB 08 
NGPWB 09 Sea Witch
NGPWB 10

Noosacat 930 harbour personnel boats
0901
0902
0903
0904

Riviera class VIP launch
 38103 Admiral Hudson

Admiral's barge
AB 1201 Green Parrot

Shark Cat 800 harbour personnel boats
0801
0802
0803
0805

Naval work boats
NWB 1230
NWB 1260
NWB 1281 Otter
NWB 1282 Walrus
NWB 1285 Grampus
NWB 1286 Dolphin
NWB 1287
NWB 1288
NWB 1289
NWB 1290
NWB 1291
NWB 1292 Turtle

Halvorsen-design workboat
AWB 4011

40-foot Mk 1 and 1963-design workboats
AWB 404
AWB 421
AWB 423
AWB 424
AWB 436
AWB 440
AWB 1658
AWB 4006
AWB 4007

AWB Mod. II workboat
4010

AWB short and long group cabin workboats
Amethyst
4002

7.2 metre rigid-hulled inflatable boats
27 RHIBS, numbered 0701 through 0727

Radio controlled surface targets
RCST 06
RCST 07
RCST 08
RCST 09
RCST 10
RCST 11

Wallaby-class water and fuel lighters

Wallaby
Wombat
Warrigal
Wyulda

All vessels have been retired and Replaced by larger, newer and safer designed craft post 2017.

Torpedo recovery craft
446 Tuna
447 Trevally
448 Tailor

Withdrawn and no longer operated. Vessels have been sold to private owners.

Compact tug
Tancred - Damen ASD Tug 2310

Tug/workboat
Wattle - Damen Stan Tug 1606

Coastal tugs
2601 Tammar
Seahorse Quenda
Seahorse Chuditch
Elwing - Damen Standard built ASD 2411
Waree - Damen Standard built ASD 2411

Medium harbour tug
1801 Quokka

Bronzewing
Currawong
Mollymawk

Training craft
Aviation training ship
MV Sycamore (owned by DMS, crewed by Teekay)

Sail training craft
850576 Salthorse

Swarbrick III class small training yachts
STY 3807 Alexander of Cresswell
STY 3808 Friendship of Leeuwin
STY 3809 Lady Peryhyn of Nirimba
STY 3810 Charlotte of Cerberus
STY 3811 Scarborough of Cerberus

Tasar sail dinghies
63 vessels, numbered between 1925 and 2546

ASI 315 class navigation and seamanship training craft
Seahorse Mercator

References

External links

Shipping companies of Australia
Companies based in Sydney
Defence companies of Australia
P&O (company)
Serco
Australian subsidiaries of foreign companies
Australian companies established in 1997
Transport companies established in 1997